Ivar de Graaf (born 20 August 1973)  is the founder and drummer of the Dutch progressive metal band Kingfisher Sky, but best known as the former drummer of the popular Dutch metal band  Within Temptation.

Early career
Ivar de Graaf was born in Amsterdam, and began playing drums at the age of 11. De Graaf followed education at the Haags Montessori Lyceum in The Hague, and was taught to play drums by Charles Schouten who has been the drummer for Kayak for a short period of time. On the HML he frequently performed with Edo van der Kolk and Michiel Parqui around 1990.

Within Temptation
He was asked to be the drummer for Within Temptation 1996, at that the time the band was relatively unknown and began working on their first studio album. De Graaf was credited as the drummer on the Within Temptation albums Enter and on their breakthrough album Mother Earth.

In 2002, just before the German tour in which followed the band to its international breakthrough, he left Within Temptation. This was for musical reasons, he wanted to play more various and challenging drum fills instead of the more similar he experienced in Within Temptation, and develop himself more as a composer an arranger. He was replaced by Stephen van Haestregt

De Graaf has performed with Within Temptation a few times after his departure. He filled in as a substitute at times when van Haestregt was unavailable, and at both the Java Concert in Amsterdam in 2005 and at the Elements Concert in Antwerp in 2012 he took on stage with other former Within Temptation band members and performed a couple of songs. He accompanied singer Sharon den Adel on acoustic guitar for Within Temptation's Together at Home concert on March 24, 2020.

Kingfisher Sky
De Graaf is married to singer Judith Rijnveld. Together they worked for three years on a demo which led to the formation of Kingfisher Sky. The first studio album has been released: Hallway of Dreams.

1973 births
Living people
Dutch drummers
Male drummers
Within Temptation members
Musicians from Amsterdam
21st-century drummers